Homeobox protein Nkx-2.2 is a protein that in humans is encoded by the NKX2-2 gene.

Homeobox protein Nkx-2.2 contains a homeobox domain and may be involved in the morphogenesis of the central nervous system. This gene is found on chromosome 20 near NKX2-4, and these two genes appear to be duplicated on chromosome 14 in the form of TITF1 and NKX2-8. The encoded protein is likely to be a nuclear transcription factor.

The expression of Nkx2-2 is regulated by an antisense RNA called Nkx2-2as.

In the developing spinal cord, Nkx-2.2 regulates IRX3 thereby contributing to the proper differentiation of the ventral horn neurons.

References

Further reading 

 
 
 
 
 

Transcription factors